The following lists provide information about games considered the best for various types of games and criteria:

List of video games considered the best
List of Game of the Year awards (video games)
List of Game of the Year awards (board games)

Top lists